United Nations Security Council Resolution 588, adopted unanimously on 8 October 1986, after expressing concern at the continuation of the conflict between Iran and Iraq, the Council urged both countries to implement Resolution 582 (1986) without delay.

The resolution requested the Secretary-General to intensify his efforts to give effect to ensure Resolution 582 is implemented, reporting back no later than 30 November 1986. The Secretary-General, in his report published on 24 November, stated he had established communications with both countries, but that the positions from both governments showed no convergence which would allow for the implementation of the current resolution.

See also
 Iran–Iraq relations
 Iran–Iraq War
 List of United Nations Security Council Resolutions 501 to 600 (1982–1987)
 Resolutions 479, 514, 522, 540, 552, 582, 598, 612, 616, 619 and 620

References

External links
 
Text of the Resolution at undocs.org

 0588
 0588
1986 in Iran
1986 in Iraq
October 1986 events